Pam Rose is an American country music songwriter. In her career, she has been a member of the groups Calamity Jane and Kennedy Rose, both times pairing with fellow songwriter Mary Ann Kennedy. Rose's co-writing credits include the Grammy Award-nominated songs "Ring on Her Finger, Time on Her Hands" by Lee Greenwood and "I'll Still Be Loving You" by Restless Heart. Other songs that she has written include "Safe in the Arms of Love" by Martina McBride and "You Will" by Patty Loveless.

She has also worked with songwriting for Swedish country singer Jill Johnson.

Discography
Albums

Singles

Chart Singles Written by Pam Rose

The following is a list of Pam Rose compositions that were chart hits.

References

American women country singers
American country singer-songwriters
Living people
People from Chattanooga, Tennessee
Singer-songwriters from Tennessee
Place of birth missing (living people)
Year of birth missing (living people)
Country musicians from Tennessee
Calamity Jane (band) members
Kennedy Rose members
21st-century American women